Road Rock Vol. 1: Friends & Relatives is a live album released in 2000 by Canadian / American musician Neil Young. The "friends and relatives" include Ben Keith, Chrissie Hynde, Duck Dunn, Young's then wife, Pegi, and his sister, Astrid. The album features an unreleased song, "Fool for Your Love", which dates from Young's This Note's for You period and a Bob Dylan cover, "All Along the Watchtower".

A companion DVD/VHS video called Red Rocks Live, Neil Young Friends & Relatives was also released to accompany the album, containing footage from Young's concerts at Red Rocks Amphitheater recorded on Sep 19 & 20, 2000.
Red Rocks Live was recorded by David Hewitt on Remote Recording Services' Silver Truck.

Track listing

CD
All tracks composed by Neil Young; except where indicated

 "Cowgirl in the Sand" – 18:11 - San Diego 9/25/2000
 "Walk On" – 4:01   - Vancouver 10/1/2000
 "Fool for Your Love" (previously unreleased) – 3:20  - Santa Barbara 9/28/2000
 "Peace of Mind" – 4:52  - Vancouver 10/1/2000
 "Words" – 11:07  - Vancouver 10/1/2000
 "Motorcycle Mama" – 4:12  - San Diego 9/25/2000
 "Tonight's the Night" – 10:34 - San Diego 9/25/2000
 "All Along the Watchtower" (Bob Dylan) – 8:11  - Cleveland 8/29/2000

DVD
 "Intro"
 "Motorcycle Mama"
 "Powderfinger"
 "Everybody Knows This Is Nowhere"
 "I Believe In You"
 "Unknown Legend"
 "Fool For Your Love"
 "Buffalo Springfield Again"
 "Razor Love"
 "Daddy Went Walkin'"
 "Peace of Mind"
 "Walk On"
 "Winterlong"
 "Bad Fog of Loneliness"
 "Words"
 "Harvest Moon"
 "World on a String"
 "Tonight's The Night"
 "Cowgirl In The Sand"
 "Credits"
 "Mellow My Mind"

Personnel
Neil Young - guitar, piano, vocals
Ben Keith - guitar, lap slide, pedal steel, vocals
Spooner Oldham - piano, Wurlitzer electric piano, Hammond B3 organ
Donald "Duck" Dunn - bass
Jim Keltner - drums, percussion
Astrid Young - vocals
Pegi Young - vocals
Chrissie Hynde - guitar, vocals on "All Along the Watchtower"

References

Neil Young live albums
2000 live albums
Reprise Records live albums
Albums produced by Neil Young
Albums produced by Ben Keith